ZyX is a Japanese erotic bishōjo video game maker. Some of their products have been localized in North America by JAST USA under the G-Collections label, and most of them feature designs by either Masahiro Yamane or Keiji Muto.

In May 2009, ZyX was integrated into .

List of games
Games are arranged alphabetically by romaji title; modified Hepburn romanization is used.

Note: This list does not include all of the variations in the releases (CD-ROM, DVD-ROM, DVDPG ("DVD Players [sic] Game"), collections, and other reissues), only the primary games.

References

Jursudakul, James. "JAST USA English Dating-Sims Panel (18+) Complete Transcript" (from Anime Expo 2007). Advanced Media Network, June 30, 2007.

External links
 ZyX Official Homepage
 G-Collections

Video game publishing brands